Lee Francis "Rocky" Biddle (born May 21, 1976) is a former relief pitcher in Major League Baseball. He played for the Chicago White Sox and Montreal Expos. He was drafted by the White Sox in the 1st round (51st pick) of the 1997 amateur draft.

External links

1976 births
Living people
American expatriate baseball players in Canada
Arizona League White Sox players
Baseball players from Nevada
Birmingham Barons players
Charlotte Knights players
Chicago White Sox players
Hickory Crawdads players
Long Beach State Dirtbags baseball players
Major League Baseball pitchers
Montreal Expos players
Sportspeople from Las Vegas
Winston-Salem Warthogs players